Olu Erejuwa was the 15th Olu of Warri who ruled over the Kingdom of Warri. He succeeded Olu Atogbuwa as the 15th Olu of Warri. He took the title, Ogiame Erejuwa I. His Portuguese name was Sebastiao Manuel Octobia. When he went to be with his fathers, he was succeeded by Olu Akengbuwa around 1795.

References

Nigerian traditional rulers
People from Warri
Year of birth unknown
Year of death unknown